The 1996 Vuelta a Asturias was the 40th edition of the Vuelta a Asturias road cycling stage race, which was held from 14 May to 19 May 1996. The race started and finished in Oviedo. The race was won by Miguel Induráin of the  team.

General classification

References

Further reading

Vuelta Asturias
1996 in road cycling
1996 in Spanish sport